Czechoslovakia competed at the 1976 Winter Olympics in Innsbruck, Austria.

Medalists

Alpine skiing

Men

Women

Biathlon

Men

 1 One minute added per close miss (a hit in the outer ring), two minutes added per complete miss.

Men's 4 x 7.5 km relay

 2 A penalty loop of 200 metres had to be skied per missed target.

Bobsleigh

Cross-country skiing

Men

Men's 4 × 10 km relay

Women

Women's 4 × 5 km relay

Figure skating

Men

Women

Pairs

Ice Dancing

Ice hockey

First round
Winners (in bold) entered the Medal Round. Other teams played a consolation round for 7th-12th places.

|}

Medal round

Czechoslovakia 2–1 Finland
Czechoslovakia 5–0 USA
Poland 1–0* Czechoslovakia
Czechoslovakia 7–4 West Germany
USSR 4–3 Czechoslovakia

* Note: The score after the Czechoslovakia vs Poland match was 7-1, but due to the positive doping test of one of the Czechoslovakian players, the team was recorded a 0-1 loss. Poland didn't receive any points.

Luge

Men

(Men's) doubles

Women

Nordic combined 

Events:
 normal hill ski jumping 
 15 km cross-country skiing

Ski jumping

References 
 Official Olympic Reports
 International Olympic Committee results database
 Olympic Winter Games 1976, full results by sports-reference.com

Nations at the 1976 Winter Olympics
1976
Winter Olympics